Randy Erskine (born July 8, 1948) is an American professional golfer. He played as an amateur at the University of Michigan and won the 1970 Big Ten Conference championship.  He turned professional in 1973 and won the Michigan Open five times between 1976 and 1985.  He also won the 1978 Michigan PGA Championship, finished fifth at the 1977 Buick Open, and won the 2011 Michigan Senior PGA Championship.

Early years
Erskine was born in Springfield, Ohio and raised in Battle Creek, Michigan, graduating from Pennfield High School in 1966.

Amateur career
Erskine attended the University of Michigan where he won the 1970 Big Ten Conference golf championship at Savoy, Illinois.  He was also selected as an All-American in 1968 and 1970.

As an amateur, Erskine also won the 1972 Michigan State Amateur Championship, the Michigan Medal Play, and the GAM Championship.

Professional career
In 1973, Erskine began competing as a professional. He played on the PGA Tour from 1974 to 1979, with his best finish coming at the 1977 Buick Open where he tied for fifth place. As a professional, he won the 1978 Michigan PGA Championship, was a five-time winner of the Michigan Open (1976, 1978, 1979, 1984, and 1985), and a two-time winner of the MPGA Match Play.

Honors and awards
He was inducted into the University of Michigan Athletic Hall of Honor in 1989 and the Michigan Golf Hall of Fame in 1991.

Amateur wins
this list may be incomplete
1968 Michigan Medal Play
1970 Big Ten Championship
1972 Michigan State Amateur Championship

Professional wins
this list may be incomplete
1976 Michigan Open
1978 Michigan Open, Michigan PGA Championship
1979 Michigan Open
1982 Michigan Pro-Am Championship (with Danny Roberts)
1984 Michigan Open, PGA Club Professional Tournament Series event at Monte Carlo Country Club, Fort Pierce, Florida
1985 Michigan Open, PGA Club Professional Tournament at Marion Oaks Country Club 
1986 Michigan PGA Match Play Tournament
2011 Michigan Senior PGA Championship

See also 

 1973 PGA Tour Qualifying School graduates

References

External links

American male golfers
Michigan Wolverines men's golfers
PGA Tour golfers
Golfers from Ohio
Golfers from Michigan
Sportspeople from Springfield, Ohio
Sportspeople from Battle Creek, Michigan
1948 births
Living people